Cortemaggiore is an Italian comune located in the Province of Piacenza.
The municipality borders Fiorenzuola d'Arda, Villanova sull'Arda, Besenzone, San Pietro in Cerro, Caorso, Pontenure and Cadeo.

The town was founded in 1479 by the Pallavicino family, over an old Roman habitation, which had been the capital of the ancient Stato Pallavicino.
In 1949 the Italian entrepreneur Enrico Mattei discovered in Cortemaggiore's subsoil an important oilfield; with this oil a gasoline called Supercortemaggiore was produced, the only one refined from Italian oil.

The municipality's motto is Nihil sanctius quam recta fides cum sororibus associata - "Nothing is holier than a true faith combined with other virtues."

Architecture
Among the religious edifices in the town are the following:
 Basilica of Santa Maria delle Grazie or Collegiata: built in Gothic style, it was once the town's cathedral and still its main church. The interior conserves a valued polyptych, composed of twelve pieces by Filippo Mazzola, the father of Parmigianino. 
San Giovanni: a church built in 1625-1630 and frescoed by Robert de Longe in 1705
Annunziata (Church of the Annunciation): built in 1487, it houses two works by Il Pordenone, an Immaculate Conception and a Deposition from the Cross. Next to the church, there is a monastery with a cloister of 40 metres on all sides.
San Giuseppe: built 1576-1593 by the brotherhood of San Giuseppe, and subsequently decorated with stuccoes by Bernardo Barca and Domenico Dossi in 1697-1701
Oratory of San Lorenzo: built in 1666.
Oratory of San Giovanni: started in 1625 by the confraternity of SS Sacramento.
Santa Maria delle Grazie fuori le mura or Madonnina: built by the priest Anotonio Bovarini in 1661.

Notable people born in Cortemaggiore
Ranuccio II Farnese (1630–94), Duke of Parma and Piacenza
Lorenzo Respighi (1824–89), mathematician, philosopher
Giuseppe Manfredi (1828–1918), patriot and President of the Italian Senate from 1908 to 1918, during the years of World War I
Franco Fabrizi (1926–95), actor

Image gallery 

1479 establishments in Europe
15th-century establishments in Italy